Hypostomus cochliodon is a species of armored catfish native to the Paraguay and middle Paraná River basins in northern Argentina, southern Brazil and Paraguay. Initially it did not occur in the upper Paraná basin above the Guaíra Falls, but these disappeared after the construction of the Itaipu Dam, allowing this species (and several others) to spread.

The species is sometimes kept in aquaria.

Unlike most other Loricariidae, it has been speculated that this fish is a wood-eating specialist alongside the usual plant material and algae (see also xylophagy in Panaque).

References

External links

cochliodon
Fish of South America
Fish of Argentina
Fish of Brazil
Fish of Paraguay
Taxa named by Rudolf Kner
Fish described in 1854